Paul M. Achleitner (born 28 September 1956, in Linz) is an Austrian businessman who served as chairman of the supervisory board of Deutsche Bank from 2012 to 2022.

Education
Achleitner studied Business Administration, Economics, Law and Social Sciences at the University of St. Gallen, where he also earned his doctorate. He was also a visiting fellowship at Harvard Business School from 1982 to 1984.

Career

Early career
Achleitner worked for Bain and Company and as the managing director of the German subsidiary of Goldman Sachs. In 2000, Achleitner joined Allianz AG as chief financial officer, where he was primarily responsible for finance and investments. He left Allianz in 2012.

Deutsche Bank, 2012–2022
after his appointment to the chairman of the supervisory board of Deutsche Bank. He retained the support of the bank's biggest shareholder, Qatari Sheikh Hamad bin Jassim bin Jaber Al Thani, and, in 2017, shareholders backed Achleitner's re-election to a second five-year term. From 2018 until 2020, he faced for three years in a row a vote to remove him from his post. Through his time in office, he oversaw multiple CEO changes, including Anshu Jain (2012-2015), Jürgen Fitschen (2012-2016), John Cryan (2015-2018) and Christian Sewing (2018–2022).

According to various surveys, Achleitner was the highest paid supervisory board head at Germany's 30 biggest listed companies that make up the benchmark DAX index between 2016 and 2018. In August 2019 alson, he bought nearly 1 million euros of the bank's shares. In Munich, he shares an office with his wife Ann-Kristin Achleitner, Michael Diekmann, Joachim Faber and Peter Löscher.

Other activities
Achleitner is an honorary professor of the WHU - Otto Beisheim School of Management in Vallendar, Germany, where he teaches a course in investment banking. He is also head of the Exchange Expert Commission, and a member of the German federal commission for the German Corporate Governance Code.

Corporate boards
 Deutsche Bank, Chair of the Global Advisory Board (since 2022)
 Hakluyt & Company, Member of the International Advisory Board (since 2022)
 Bayer AG, Member of the Supervisory Board (since 2002)
 Henkel AG & Sons, Member of the Shareholders' Committee (since 2001), Member of the Finance Subcommittee 
 Daimler, Member of the Supervisory Board (2010-2020)
 RWE AG, Member of the Supervisory Board (2000-2013)

Non-profit organizations
 Alfred Herrhausen Gesellschaft of Deutsche Bank, Chairman of the Board of Trustees
 Bilderberg Group, Treasurer and Member of the Steering Committee
 Bocconi University, Member of the International Advisory Council
 European Financial Services Roundtable (EFR), Chairman 
 Brookings Institution, Member of the Board of Trustees (since 2013)
 Munich Security Conference, Member of the Advisory Council

Personal life
He is married to Ann-Kristin Achleitner, a professor of business at Technische Universität München.

References

External links 
 Resume of Dr. Paul Achleitner

 

Living people
1956 births
German bankers
Harvard Business School alumni
University of St. Gallen alumni
Members of the Steering Committee of the Bilderberg Group
Austrian emigrants to Germany
People from Linz
Deutsche Bank people